Heroic Visions is an anthology of fantasy stories, edited by Jessica Amanda Salmonson. It was first published in paperback by Ace Books in March 1983.

The book collects eleven new short stories and novelettes by various fantasy authors, with an introduction by Salmonson.

Contents
"Introduction" (Jessica Amanda Salmonson)
"The Curse of the Smalls and the Stars" (Fritz Leiber)
"Sister Light, Sister Dark" (Jane Yolen)
"Tales Told to a Toymaker" (Phyllis Ann Karr)
"Prophecy of the Dragon" (Charles E. Karpuk)
"Before the Seas Came" (F. M. Busby)
"Thunder Mother" (Alan Dean Foster)
"Dancers in the Time-Flux" (Robert Silverberg)
"Sword Blades and Poppy Seed" (Joanna Russ)
"The Nun and the Demon" (Grania Davis)
"Vovko" (Gordon Derevanchuk)
"The Monkey's Bride" (Michael Bishop)

References

External links
 Fantastic Fiction entry

1983 anthologies
Fantasy anthologies
Ace Books books